Bongani Ndulula (born 29 November 1989) is a South African footballer who last played as a striker for Chippa United F.C. in the Premier Soccer League.

Ndulula scored his first international goal in his debut against Sudan in a 2015 Africa Cup Of Nations qualifier, and scored his second one-month later against Congo. Chippa United F.C released Ndulula in 2017, he has since been struggling to find a club.

International goals

References

External links
 Profile at Soccer Betting News

1989 births
Living people
People from Aliwal North
Xhosa people
South African soccer players
Association football forwards
Bloemfontein Celtic F.C. players
Orlando Pirates F.C. players
AmaZulu F.C. players
Kaizer Chiefs F.C. players
Chippa United F.C. players
2015 Africa Cup of Nations players
South Africa international soccer players
Soccer players from the Eastern Cape